N'Dolondougou  is a commune in the Cercle of Dioïla in the Koulikoro Region of south-western Mali. The principal town lies at Mena. As of 1998 the commune had a population of 14,756.

References

Communes of Koulikoro Region